Earl Ray Tomblin (born March 15, 1952) is an American politician who served as the 35th governor of West Virginia from 2011 to 2017. A member of the Democratic Party, he previously served in the West Virginia Senate from 1980 to 2011 and as president of the West Virginia Senate from 1995 to 2011. Tomblin became acting governor in November 2010 following Joe Manchin's election to the U.S. Senate. He won a special election in October 2011 to fill the unexpired term ending in January 2013 and was elected to a first full term as governor in November 2012.

Early life and education
Tomblin was born in Logan County, West Virginia, and is the son of Freda M. (née Jarrell) and Earl Tomblin. His mother was 18 years old when he was born. He has a Bachelor of Science degree from West Virginia University where he was a member of Kappa Alpha Order and then went along to receive a Master of Business Administration degree from Marshall University.

State Legislature and Senate President
Tomblin was elected to the West Virginia House of Delegates in 1974, and reelected in 1976 and 1978. He won election to the Senate for the 7th district in 1980 and was subsequently re-elected every four years until his election as governor.

Tomblin was elected on January 3, 1995, as the 48th President of the West Virginia Senate. Having served in the position for almost seventeen years, he is the longest serving Senate President in West Virginia's history. Tomblin became the first Lieutenant Governor of West Virginia upon creation of the honorary designation in 2000.

As a senator, he represented the 7th Senate District encompassing Boone, Lincoln, Logan, and Wayne counties.

Acting governor
Tomblin became acting governor when Joe Manchin resigned after being elected to fill the United States Senate seat of the late Senator Robert Byrd. Tomblin is the first person to serve as acting governor under West Virginia's current constitution.

While acting governor, Tomblin also retained the title of Senate President, per the state constitution. However, he did not participate in legislative business or preside over the Senate while acting governor.

Governor of West Virginia

Elections

2011 Special 

In 2011, Tomblin stated his desire to run for the governorship. Following a ruling by the Supreme Court of Appeals on January 18, 2011, a special gubernatorial election was scheduled for October 4, 2011. Tomblin was successful in the Democratic Primary, beating a field of six contenders, while Morgantown businessman Bill Maloney emerged as the Republican nominee in the May 14 primary. He went on to win the general election against Maloney and was sworn in as governor on November 13, 2011. Immediately before taking the oath as governor, Tomblin officially resigned from both the offices of Senate President and state senator.

2012 

Tomlin ran for re-election to a first full term in 2012, and defeated Maloney in a rematch.

Tenure
In the 2016 presidential election, Tomblin endorsed fellow Democrat Hillary Clinton.

Abortion
Tomblin is anti-abortion. Despite this, in March 2014, Tomblin vetoed a bill that would have banned abortions in West Virginia after 20 weeks, which he said was due to constitutionality issues. In March 2015, Tomblin again vetoed the bill; however, his veto was overridden by the West Virginia legislature.

Approval ratings
A May 2013 survey by Republican strategist Mark Blankenship showed Tomblin's job approval rating to be at 69 percent, unchanged from two months earlier. According to a poll conducted by Public Policy Polling in September 2013, Tomblin had an approval rating of 47 percent with 35 percent disapproving, up from 44 percent in 2011.

Personal life
Tomblin was married on September 8, 1979 to Joanne Jaeger, a native New Yorker and graduate of Marshall University, who served as the president of Southern West Virginia Community and Technical College from 1999 to 2015. They reside in Chapmanville and have one son, Brent. Tomblin attends the First Presbyterian Church of Logan.

Electoral history

Notes

References

External links

|-

|-

|-

|-

1952 births
20th-century American politicians
21st-century American politicians
American Presbyterians
Businesspeople from West Virginia
Democratic Party governors of West Virginia
Living people
Marshall University alumni
Democratic Party members of the West Virginia House of Delegates
People from Chapmanville, West Virginia
Presidents of the West Virginia State Senate
Democratic Party West Virginia state senators
West Virginia University alumni